The marbled ghostshark (Hydrolagus marmoratus) is a chimaera species in the family Chimaeridae, which lives in waters off the eastern coast of Australia.

References

marbled ghostshark
Marine fish of Eastern Australia
marbled ghostshark